The Legend of Robin Hood is a 90-minute TV musical aired by NBC in 1968.

Douglas Fairbanks Jr. played King Richard the Lionheart.

Cast
David Watson as Robin Hood
Douglas Fairbanks Jr. as Richard the Lionheart
 Lee Beery as Maid Marian

References

External links

The Legend of Robin Hood at BFI

1968 television films
1968 films
American television films
1968 musical films
American musical films
1960s English-language films
1960s American films